Degelia neozelandica is a species of foliose lichen in the genus Degelia.

The species was initially described under Steinera, but was removed in 1982 when the genus was revised by Aino Henssen and Peter Wilfred James. It was then placed into Parmeliella, and later into Degelia.

Distribution and habitat
Degelia neozelandica is most widely found in New Zealand, on both Macquarie and South Islands, but has also been found in a single alpine locality in Tasmania, Australia.

Associated species
Degelia neozelandica has several associated species with which it is often found. These include Parmeliella crassa, Pannaria hookeri, Solorina spongiosa, Collema coccophorum, Lecanora atra, Pertusaria dactylina, Psoroma buchanani, and Psoroma fruticulosum.

References

Peltigerales
Lichen species
Lichens of New Zealand
Taxa named by Carroll William Dodge
Lichens described in 1971